This is a list of foreign players in the Segunda Division (formally Liga Ascenio), which commenced play in 1999. The following players must meet both of the following two criteria:
Have played at least one Segunda Division regular season game. Players who were signed by Segunda Divisiom clubs, but only played in playoff games or did not play in any competitive games at all, are not included.
Are considered foreign, i.e., outside El Salvador determined by the following:
A player is considered foreign if he is not eligible to play for the national team of El Salvador.
More specifically,
If a player has been capped on international level, the national team is used; if he has been capped by more than one country, the highest level (or the most recent) team is used. These include Salvadoran players with dual citizenship.
If a player has not been capped on international level, his country of birth is used, except those who were born abroad from El Salvador parents, or El Salvador at a young age, and those who clearly indicated to have switched his nationality to another nation.
In bold: players who have played at least one Segunda Division game in the current season (2020 Apertura season), and are still at the clubs for which they have played. This does not include current players of a Segunda division club who have not played a Segunda division game in the current season.

Naturalized Players 
  Rafael Acosta - Santa Tecla
  Steve Benitez - La Asuncion
  Elder José Figueroa - Juventud 72, Inca Super Flat, UDET, Fuerte San Francisco, Vista Hermosa, Aspirante, Once Municipal
  Williams Reyes - Aspirante

Africa – CAF

Ghana 
 James Owusu-Ansah - Once Lobos

Nigeria 
 Evans Ikpeoha - Independiente F.C., Fuerte San Francisco
 George Martin Ankamah - Aspirante

Togo 
 Fábio Pereira de Azevedo - Platense

South America – CONMEBOL

Argentina 
 Dante Alejandro - Jocoro
 Gabriel Álvarez - Ágape TV
 Maximiliano Ayala - Real Destroyer
 Dionel Bordón - A.D. Municipal
 Rodrigo Brito - Turin FESA
 Jonathan Cerrutti - Titan
  Roberto “Teto” Chanampe -  FAS Candelareño
 Matías Colouca - Atletico Marte, Juayua
 Carlos Daniel Escalante – Acajutla FC, Juventud Independiente
 David Fasil - Topiltzin
 Gustavo Ariel Gómez - España ADESSE
 Marcelo González - Atlético Chaparratique
 Cesar Horst - Real Destroyer
 Pablo Leguizamo - Atlético Chaparratique
 Carlos Javier Martino - Inca Super Flat
 Maxi Morales - Dragon 
 Cristobal Post - Atletico Marte
 Javier Rabbia - Once Lobos , Titam
 Lucas Reynoso - Once Municipal
 Gaston Rios - Once Lobos
 Dante Segovia - Once Lobos

Brazil 
 Dimas Braz - Once Municipal
 João Carlos Da Silva - El Roble, Independiente F.C. 
 Paulo César Rodrigues de Lima - Pasaquina, Aspirante
 Felipe Messías - Dragon, La Asuncion
 Alexander Da Silva - A.D. Municipal
 Mauricio Do Santos - Once Municipal
 Luis Sergio Pereira - Aspirante
 Rodinei Martins - Dragon
 Augusto César - Platense
 Daniel Prediguer - Dragon
 Luis Felipe Ruis Tapias - Aspirante
 Josielson Moraes Silva - Fuerte San Francisco, Dragon
 Junior Dos Santos - Independiente
 Igor Dos Santos - Independiente, Liberal, Rácing Jr
 Eriko - Ilopaneco
 Evandro dos Santos - Once Lobos
 Jackson de Oliviera - Racing jr, Juayua, Dragon
 Philipinho Pedorrinho - Liberal
 Regis Da Silva - A.D. Municipal
 Jadyr Da Sliva Santos - Racing jr
 Josielson Moraes - CD Gerardo Barrios

Chile 
  Carlos Hoffman  - Vendaval

Colombia 
 Argenis Alba - Marte Soyapango
 Orlando Alba - Atletico Marte
 Carlos Anchico - A.D. Municipal, Chalatenango
 Duban Andrade - Once Lobos
 Andrés Medina Aguirre - Vendaval, Topiltzin
 Wilber Yojair Arizala - Topiltzin, Platense
 Carlos Asprilla - Jocoro
 José Bautista Balanta - Aspirante
 Brayan Bermudez - Cacahuatique
 Juan Bonilla - Marte Soyapango, Vendaval
 Teodulo Bonilla - Vendaval
 Jefferson Bueno - UDET
 Cristian Caicedo - Once Lobos
 Deyner Cañate - Ciclon del Golfo, Aspirante
 Emerson Cangá - Liberal
 Juan Camilo Carabali -  San Pablo Tacachico
 John Castillo (footballer) - Dragon
 Luis Castillo - Vendaval
 Daniel Andres Castrillon -  - Aspirante
 Juna Chann - AD Santa Rosa Guachipilín
 Juan Manuel Charry - Atletico Marte
 Nicolás Claros - Atletico Marte
 Victor Contreras - Gerarado Barrios, Topiltzin
 Alexis D'Abuisson  - Vendaval
 Juan Camilo Delgado - San Pablo, Platense, Once Lobos
 Andrez Diaz -
 Bladimir Díaz - Chalatenango, Once Lobos
 Lucas Diaz -  Brujos de Izalco
 Juan Escobar - Fuerte San Francisco
 Rober Espinal - Marte Soyapango
 Marcó Tulio Gallego - Aspirante
 Daniel García- San Pablo
 Brian Gil - Brujos de Izalco
 Cristian Gil - Brujos de Izalco, Platense
 Mayer Gil - AD Destroyer
 Antony Gómez - El Roble
 Camilo Gómez - Once Municipal, Ilopaneco
 Cristian Gomez - Cacahuatique, Ilopango FC
 Fredy Gonzales - Marte Soyapango, Brasilia, Sonsonate, Chalatenango 33
 Nildeson Gonzales - Independiente
 Cristian Gonzalez Grueso - Vendaval
 Roger Guerrero - Titan
 William Guerrero - Chalatenango, Marte Soyapango, Real Destroyer, Once Municipal, Platense, Vendaval, Atletico Marte, C.D. Topiltzín
 Anderson Herrera - Ilopaneco
 Diomer Hinestroza - Topiltzin, El Vencedor, Liberal, El Vencedor
 Dylan Hurtado - Titan 
 Mayer Gil Hurtado - Brujos
 Fernando Landazuri - Cacahuatique
 Héctor Luis Lemus - Aspirante, Independiente F.C., Juayua (Municipal FC)
 Sebastián Macasaet - Real Destroyer
 Jhon Emiro Machado - El Vencedor, Marte Soyapango
 Fary Mancilla - Independiente F.C., Gerardo Barrios
 Yohanny Mancilla - Fuerte San Francisco, Aspirante
 Brayan Bermudez Mazo - Cacahuatique
 Edgar Medrano - Juayua
 Jose Medrano - Titan, Topiltzin
 Daley Mena - Inter Sivar
 Michel Mercado - El Roble
 Dago Alberto Milla - Topiltzin
 Neimer Miranda - Once Municipal, El Roble
  Alexander Tejada Molano - Once Lobos
 Juan Carlos Morelos - Atiquizaya
 Alvaro Moreno - Vendaval
 Leider Moreno  - La Asuncion 
 Alexis Mosquera - Once Lobos
 Cristian Ali Gil Mosquera - Once Lobos, Audaz, Brujos de Izalco, Fuerte San Francisco
 Fernando Mosquera
 Jhon Mosquera - C.D. Aspirantes
 Victor Mosquera - Vendaval
 Oscar Motoa - Marte Soyapango, Brasilia, Ilopaneco
 Luis Aroleda Murillo - Cacahuatique
 Alexander Obregón - Ágape TV
 Bryan Obregon - Rácing Jr, San Pablo Tacachico
 Breiner Ortiz - Once Lobos, Titan
 Sebastián Ortiz - Ilopaneco
 Gerson Páez - A.D. Municipal
 Carlos Mario Palacios- Juayua (Municipal FC)
 Johalim Palacios - Atletico Marte
 Jefferson Palacios - Fuerte San Francisco
 Luis Palacios - Brujos de Izalco, Topiltzin, San Pablo Tacachico
 Yeferson Palacios - AD Santa Rosa Guachipilín
 Yohalin Palacios - Santa Rosa
 Boris Polo - Vendaval
 John Polo - Once Lobos, Arcense
 Jeison Quinones - San Pablo
 Jimmy Quiñónez - San Luis F.C.
 José Marcos Quiñónez - El Vencedor
 Pedro Quiñonez - Once Municipal
 Keiner Rentería - Chaguite
 Roger Albeiro Rico - San Pablo
 Camilo Rivas- Vendaval
 Luis Torres Rodríguez - La Asuncion
 Santiago Rodríguez - Once Municipal
 Carlos Salazar - Juayua
  Andres Salinas - Santa Rosa Guachipilin
 Jose Luis Sanabria - Cacahuatique
 Amaranto Sanchez - Chalatenango 33, Santa Rosa
 Ferdín Sánchez - Mar y Plata 
 Luis Sanchez - Santa Rosa
 Wilson Sánchez - Santa Tecla F.C.
 Christian Camilo Santanna - Ilopaneco
 Juan Daniel Sinisterra - Titan
 Yuri Sinisterra - Fuerte San Francisco
 Efraín Solano - C.D. UDET
 Gabriel Suárez - Once Municipal
 Edier Tello - Ilopaneco
 Jerson Tobar - Fuerte San Francisco
 Andrés Urrego - Fuerte San Francisco
 Carlos Urrego - Dragon
 Hector Valencia - Atletico Apopa
 Walter Valencia - Once Municipal, San Rafael Cedros, Real Destroyer, Fuerte San Francisco
 Andrés Vallecilla - Ciclon del Golfo, Fuerte San Francisco, Once Municipal, Chaguite, Aspirante, Liberal
 Jimmy Valoyes - Ciclon de Golfo
 Jefferson Viveros - Brujos de Izalco, AD Destroyer, Aspirante

Paraguay 
 Nelson Chaparro Agüero - Atletico Comalapa
 David Diosnel Álvarez - Chalatenango
 Pablo Caballero - Municipal Limeno
 Gabriel Garcete - Leones de Occidente, Once Lobos
 Javier Lezcano - Fuerte San Francisco

Peru 
 Jair Camero - Vista Hermosa

Uruguay 
 Claudio Pasadi - CD TACA
 Jonathan Piñeiro - Chaguite
 Juan Carlos Reyes - Juventud Independiente, Topiltzin, Sonsonate
 Leonardo Sum Rodríguez - Municipal Limeno
 Sergio Maximiliano Suárez - Isidro Metapan B
 Stivens Maciel - Fuerte San Francisco

CONCACAF

Belize  
 Cesario Rosales - Once Lobos

Costa Rica  
 Luis Roberto Velásquez - Fuerte San Francisco
 Carlos Luis Rodríguez Marín  - Jocoro

Dominican Republic 
 Luis Sandy Lay - Mar y Plata

Guatemala  
 Cesar Cobar - Fuerte San Francisco
 Hristopher Robles - Turin FESA

Honduras  
 Denis Alemán - Atlético Chaparratique
 Ángel Álvarez - Limeno
 Heráclito Amaya - Dragon
 Keller Andino  — Once Municipal
 Ernesto Noel Aquino - Atletico Balboa
 Harry Bernárdez  - Aspirante
 Erick Aziel Hernandez Berrios - Dragon
 Alfred Boden - Dragon
 Alfred Bodden - Atlético Chaparratique
 César Castro - Aspirante
 Benjamin Chamorro - Chaguite
 Gregory Costly - Jocoro, Liberal, Real Atletico Sonsonate
 Raúl Galindo - Chalatenango
 Gustavo Gómez Funes - Fuerte San Francisco
 Antonio Gómez - Limeno
 Fabián Hernández - Fuerte San Francisco
 Ericksen Marquina - La Asunción, Pasaquina
 David Ordoñez  - La Asunción
 Andres Ortiz - Gerardo Barrios
 Osmar - Aspirante
 Pablo Róchez - Fuerte San Francisco, Inca Super Flat
 German Alexis Rodriguez - Topiltzín
 Nelson Sambulla - Independiente F.C.
 Hugo Sarmiento - Topiltzín, Fuerte San Francisco, Aspirante, El Roble, San Luis F.C.
 Eugenio Valerio - Atletico Balboa
 Franklin Vinosis Webster - Atletico Balboa, Ciclon de Golfo
 Brayan Zúniga - Jocoro, Dragon

Jamaica  
 Mckauly Tulloch - Once Municipal
 Garrick Gordon - Dragon, Marte Soyapango, Brasilia, Real Destroyer

Mexico   
 Arnulfo Canchola - Once Lobos

Panama   
 Victor Barrera - Titan, Sonsonate, Audaz, Brujos de Izalco, Vendaval
 Raziel Scarlett - Titan
 Rolando Asprilla - Chalatenango, Acajutla FC
 Ferdin Sánchez - Mar y Plata

St. Kitts and Nevis  
 Carlos Bertie - Once Municipal

Trinidad and Tobago 
Akil Pompey — Once Municipal

Notes

References

External links
 http://archivo.elsalvador.com/noticias/2004/06/10/deportes/dep6.asp
 http://archivo.elsalvador.com/noticias/2004/10/12/deportes/dep2.asp

El Salvador
Foreign
Association football player non-biographical articles